Burleigh "Buck" Johnson is an American singer-songwriter and multi-instrumentalist, performing as a backing vocalist, keyboardist and acoustic guitarist with Aerosmith, Hollywood Vampires (Johnny Depp, Alice Cooper, Joe Perry), Steven Tyler, and Joe Perry.  He was co-vocalist, co-guitarist and keyboardist for the country music group Whiskey Falls (Midas Records).  Johnson released his self-titled album in 2016 on Spectra Music Group and tours with his band as a solo artist. He has had songs placed in television, film and recorded by other artists including “Just Feel Better” by Carlos Santana, featuring Steven Tyler on lead vocals.

Biography 
Buck Johnson was raised outside of Birmingham, Alabama, in a town called Shady Grove. He began performing at an early age, singing gospel music with his family throughout the South. While attending Birmingham-Southern College, Buck met his wife, Kym, and they relocated to Los Angeles, California.

In Los Angeles, Johnson toured and recorded with such acts as The Doobie Brothers, Chris Stills, Tal Bachman, John Waite, Matthew Sweet, Shawn Mullins, The Thorns, and Timothy B. Schmit (The Eagles).  He has worked as a songwriting collaborator, session vocalist and musician with songwriter/producers Jamie Houston (Carlos Santana, Jon McLaughlan) and Charlie Midnight (The Doobie Brothers).

As a songwriter, Johnson co-wrote the song “Just Feel Better” with Jamie Houston and Damon Johnson for Carlos Santana on his 2005 album All That I Am, featuring Steven Tyler on lead vocals.

In 2006, Buck joined the country rock band Whiskey Falls as a principal songwriter, co-vocalist and multi-instrumentalist, and moved to Nashville, Tennessee. Whiskey Falls released their self-titled album on Midas Records in 2007, earning two Country Top 40 hit singles, “Last Train Running” and “Falling Into You.”

In 2014, Johnson was asked to join Aerosmith on their European and North American tours on keyboard, acoustic guitarist and backing vocals. Of Johnson's inclusion into the band, Steven Tyler commented, "Buck Johnson came in out of the blue and purely by chance to our Aerosmith family, and we feel we really won the lottery. Big. Turns out he's much, much more than just a guy to sing harmony with. He plays slammin' guitar and is out of this world on anything keys. He's a true all-around talent, a huge asset to me and Aerosmith and also a great human being and friend.”

In 2016, Johnson was asked to play keyboards and sing backing vocals on the Whitford-St. Holmes album, Reunion (2016).  The group toured that year, opening for British hard rock band Whitesnake.

Johnson recorded keyboards on Joe Perry’s album Sweetzerland Manifesto (2018), and continues to actively tour with Perry, Hollywood Vampires, and Aerosmith as keyboardist, acoustic guitarist and backing vocalist.

Solo Albums & Singles

Guest Appearances

References

External links 
 

Year of birth missing (living people)
Living people
American male singer-songwriters
American multi-instrumentalists
Hollywood Vampires (band) members
Whiskey Falls members
Singer-songwriters from Alabama